Chorey-les-Beaune (literally Chorey near Beaune) is a commune in the Côte-d'Or department in eastern France.

It lies northeast of the city of Beaune on the plain of the Saône just to the east of the A31 autoroute.

Population

Wine

Chorey-les-Beaune is one of the wine communes of the Côte de Beaune. The wines of Chorey-les-Beaune grow on the relatively flat land of the Saône plain, rather than on the slopes of the Côte d'Or, and for this reason the commune has no Premier Cru (or Grand Cru) vineyards. The soils are composed mostly of quaternary detrital and alluvial fills, and the wines tend to be thinner and less complex than those grown on the Jurassic limestone, gravels, and marls of the slopes from which the better quality wines of the Côte d'Or come.

See also
 Côte de Beaune

References

Communes of Côte-d'Or
Côte-d'Or communes articles needing translation from French Wikipedia